The Gap Ward is a Brisbane City Council ward covering The Gap, Ferny Grove, Upper Kedron and parts of Ashgrove, Bardon and Keperra.

Councillors for The Gap Ward

Results

References 

City of Brisbane wards